Emily Duggan (born 28 December 1992) is an Australian race car driver from Brisbane, as of 2016 based in Dural, New South Wales.

Racing career
Duggan made her racing debut in the 2014 NSW Excel Racing Development Series, scoring a race victory in her debut season and finishing seventh overall in the standings.

In 2015 Duggan remained in the Excel category, competing in both the NSW and Interstate Series. She recorded several podium finishes and placed third overall in the Interstate Series.

2016 was Duggan's breakout year, becoming the first female driver to race in the Australian V8 Touring Car Series, competing in the opening round at Sandown raceway with RSport Race Engineering and finishing 11th in the third race of the weekend. She raced in the 2016 Challenge Bathurst event, where she drove the fastest lap in a Hyundai Excel. She had several podium finishes in the 2016 Series X3 NSW category including winning the one-hour endurance race and recording 15 top-five finishes for the season. Duggan finished fifth overall in the championship.

Duggan returned to Series X3 NSW in 2017, finishing fourth in the championship with five race wins.

Duggan announced she would contest the Australian Toyota 86 Racing Series in 2018.

In 2019, she announced that she would contest both the Australian Toyota 86 Racing Series and the Kumho Super3 Series.

Career results

References

External links
 Official Website
 
 Profile on Super3 webpage
 Third Turn profile

1992 births
Living people
Australian female racing drivers
Racing drivers from Brisbane